

Kurt Haseloff (1894–1978) was a German general during World War II.

Kurt Haseloff was born in Metz in Alsace-Lorraine. He served as a Lieutenant during World War I. He was retained in the Reichswehr, and then in the Wehrmacht of Nazi Germany

During the Second World War, Kurt Haseloff participated in many significant military operations. Chief of Staff of the General Army Office in September 1939, Haseloff was assigned commander of the 5th Rifle-Brigade from March 1941 to July 1942, before being assigned commander of the 5th Panzer-Grenadier-Brigade. Haseloff attained the rank of Generalmajor on 1 January 1943. Haseloff was assigned Chief of the General Staff of the Commanding General of Military-District General-Government from January 1943 to May 1944. Haseloff was eventually assigned Chief of the Household-Department in OKH from May 1944 to August 11, 1944.

Kurt Haseloff died on 30 September 1978 in Munich.

Decorations
 Iron Cross of 1914, 2nd and 1st classes
 Iron Cross of 1939, 2nd and 1st classes
 Military Merit Cross, 3rd class with War Decoration (Austria-Hungary)
 Silver Medal for Bravery (Austria-Hungary)
 Honour Cross of the World War 1914/1918
 Austrian War Commemorative Medal with Swords
 Hungarian World War Commemorative Medal with Swords
 Wehrmacht Long Service Award, 4th to 1st class
 Sudetenland Medal with Prague Castle clasp
 Eastern Front Medal
 War Merit Cross (1939), 1st and 2nd class with Swords

References

Sources
 (de) Dermot Bradley: Die Generale des Heeres 1921-1945, Band 5: v. Haack-Hitzfeld; Biblio Verlag, Osnabrück, 1999.

1894 births
1978 deaths
Military personnel from Metz
People from Alsace-Lorraine
Major generals of the German Army (Wehrmacht)
Recipients of the clasp to the Iron Cross, 1st class
Recipients of the Medal for Bravery (Austria-Hungary)